Loving Lies is a 1924 silent American silent drama film directed by W. S. Van Dyke and starring Evelyn Brent and Monte Blue.

Plot
As described in a film magazine review, just after Ellen Craig has married Dan Stover, captain of a tug boat, she discovers that his new boss, Tom Hayden, is a former sweetheart of hers that she had discarded. Tom cleverly uses his position to arouse jealousy and marital misunderstandings between Dan and Ellen, and succeeds in this by exposing the white lies which Dan has told his wife to keep her from worrying about him while he is at sea. The climax of these complications is reached when Dan is called upon to brave a severe storm, taking his tug to rescue a steamship on which his wife is fleeing with Tom, who has finally falsely persuaded her that her husband is infatuated with another woman. By a superhuman effort, Dan reaches the steamer just in time to save his wife using a breeches buoy from the swaying rigging of the wreck while Tom perishes in the raging waters.

Cast

Preservation
With no prints of Loving Lies located in any film archives, it is a lost film.

References

External links 

Still of Monte Blue at silenthollywood.com

1924 films
1924 drama films
Silent American drama films
American silent feature films
American black-and-white films
Films directed by W. S. Van Dyke
Lost American films
1924 lost films
Lost drama films
1920s American films